Rowdy Boys is a 2022 Indian Telugu-language coming of age romantic college drama film written and directed by Sree Harsha Konuganti and produced by Dil Raju and Shirish through Sri Venkateswara Creations. The film features debutant Ashish, son of Dil Raju's brother Sirish and Anupama Parameswaran in lead roles with music composed by Devi Sri Prasad. The film was released theatrically on 14 January 2022. The film received negative reviews from critics.

Plot 
Akshay is a first year engineer student who falls for a medical student Kavya. However the war between the medical college and engineering college is a threat to their love. Will their love survive?

Cast 

 Ashish as Akshay
 Anupama Parameswaran as Kavya
 Karthik Rathnam
 Sahidev Vikram
 Tej Kurapati
 Komalee Prasad as Shruti, Kavya's friend
 Srikanth Iyengar as Akshay's father
 Racha Ravi
 Praneeth Reddy Kallem
 Pridhvi

Production 
Anupama was cast in March 2020 to play the lead actress. Rahul Ramakrishna was approached to do a role in the film, but couldn't join the film as he was busy working with RRR. Later, Racha Ravi was cast to do the role. In an interview with Deccan Chronicle, Komalee Prasad told about role in the film that "I am a qualified dental surgeon, so shooting for scenes involving doctors and the medical fraternity was a great experience. In fact, I got nostalgic while shooting for campus scenes".

Filming began in January 2020 and was wrapped up on 13 October 2021 after shooting the song "Date Night", choreographed by Jani Master. Speaking about the idea of the film, director Konuganti revealed that the film is inspired by an incident in his own college days. He further told: "My personal experiences in my academic life inspired me to write Rowdy Boys. The story is a perfect blend of comedy, friendship, gang fights, misunderstandings, ego clashes and, of course, love. The film brings back fond memories of college life and for those still at college, it tells you that these are the most cherished days in your life. I think all of us have these memories because it's a phase of mixed emotions".

Soundtrack 

The film's soundtrack album is composed by Devi Sri Prasad.

Release 
During the release event of "Preme Aakasamaithe" song in October 2021, producer Dil Raju announced that the film will release on 19 November 2021, but was postponed. Finally, the film was released on 14 January 2022 coinciding with the festival of Bhogi and Sankranti, following the postponement of major Telugu productions like RRR and Radhe Shyam.

Reception 
The film received negative reviews from critics, although praising the performances of lead cast but criticized the story, narration and second half. Pinkvilla gave the film a rating of 2.5/5 and wrote "DSP's catch-all music saves this generic, bland love story". 123 Telugu gave the film a rating of 2.75/5 and wrote "Rowdy Boys is a college drama with not many twists and turns. Ashish Reddy makes a decent debut and the first half is good. But a dull second half and lack of a strong story is a drawback. Youngsters might connect to the movie as it offers relatable elements. Just go in with low expectations and enjoy this college romance".

Sangeetha Devi K of The Hindu appreciated the music by Devi Sri Prasad and wrote: "The biggest issue with Rowdy Boys is that it can remind you of a bunch of older films, to the extent that it ends up like a patchwork of inspired sequences." A reviewer from Eenadu praised the storyline and chemistry between the leads while criticizing the screenplay.

References

External links 

 

2022 films
2020s Telugu-language films
Indian romantic action films
2022 romantic drama films
Films set in Hyderabad, India
Films shot in Hyderabad, India
Films set in universities and colleges
Sri Venkateswara Creations films
Films about friendship
Films scored by Devi Sri Prasad